Busunju is a town in the Mityana District in the Central Region of Uganda.

Location
Busunju lies along the Kampala–Hoima Road, and is the northern end of the Kampala–Busunju Expressway. The coordinates of the town are 0°33'56.0"N, 32°12'13.0"E (Latitude:0.565568; Longitude:32.203603).

See also
List of cities and towns in Uganda

References

Populated places in Central Region, Uganda
Mityana District